The 28th Guldbagge Awards ceremony, presented by the Swedish Film Institute, honored the best Swedish films of 1992, and took place on 1 March 1993. House of Angels directed by Colin Nutley was presented with the award for Best Film.

Winner and nominees

Awards
Winners are listed first and highlighted in '''boldface.

References

External links
Official website
Guldbaggen on Facebook
Guldbaggen on Twitter
28th Guldbagge Awards at Internet Movie Database

1993 in Sweden
1992 film awards
Guldbagge Awards ceremonies
1990s in Stockholm
March 1993 events in Europe